Northwest Airlines Flight 5 was a regularly scheduled, multiple stop flight from Chicago Municipal Airport to Boeing Field, Seattle. It had intermediate stops at Minneapolis; Fargo, North Dakota; Billings, Montana; Butte, Montana; and Spokane, Washington. On October 30, 1941, on the flight's leg between Minneapolis and Fargo, the Northwest Airlines Douglas DC-3A-269 operating the route crashed into an open field about 2 1/2 miles east of the Fargo airfield, just after 2:00 am local time. All 12 passengers and two of the three crewmembers aboard were killed. The flight's captain Clarence Bates, the sole survivor, would end up dying himself a year later from another aviation accident in St. Paul, Minnesota, test-flying a Consolidated B-24.

The cause of the crash was determined to be an excessive buildup of ice on the aircraft's wings.

References

External links
 Final report of the Civil Aeronautics Board (PDF)

Airliner accidents and incidents caused by ice
Accidents and incidents involving the Douglas DC-3
1941 in Minnesota
Aviation accidents and incidents in the United States in 1941
Northwest Airlines accidents and incidents